Davor Vlaškovac (born 22 July 1967) is a Bosnian judoka.

Achievements

References

External links

1967 births
Living people
Bosnia and Herzegovina male judoka
German male judoka
Judoka at the 1996 Summer Olympics
Olympic judoka of Bosnia and Herzegovina